, also known as the Star Festival (星祭り, Hoshimatsuri), is a Japanese festival originating from the Chinese Qixi Festival. It celebrates the meeting of the deities Orihime and Hikoboshi (represented by the stars Vega and Altair respectively). According to legend, the Milky Way separates these lovers, and they are allowed to meet only once a year on the seventh day of the seventh lunar month of the lunisolar calendar. The date of Tanabata varies by region of the country, but the first festivities begin on 7 July of the Gregorian calendar. The celebration is held at various days between July and August.

History 
The festival was introduced to Japan by the Empress Kōken in 755.

The festival gained widespread popularity amongst the general public by the early Edo period, when it became mixed with various Obon or Bon traditions (because Bon was held on 15th of the seventh month then), and developed into the modern Tanabata festival. Popular customs relating to the festival varied by region of the country, but generally, girls wished for better sewing and craftsmanship, and boys wished for better handwriting by writing wishes on strips of paper. At this time, the custom was to use dew left on taro leaves to create the ink used to write wishes. Incidentally, Bon is now held on 15 August on the solar calendar, close to its original date on the lunar calendar, making Tanabata and Bon separate events.

The name Tanabata is remotely related to the Japanese reading of the Chinese characters 七夕, which used to be read as "Shichiseki" (see explanation about the various kanji readings). Gradually this ceremony merged with Kikkōden to become Tanabata. The Chinese characters 七夕 and the Japanese reading Tanabata joined to mean the same festival, although originally they were two different things, an example of jukujikun.

Story

Like Qixi and Chilseok, Tanabata was inspired by the famous Chinese folklore story, "The Cowherd and the Weaver Girl". Some versions were included in the Man'yōshū.

The most popular version is as follows:

Her father loved the cloth that she wove and so she worked very hard every day to weave it. However, Orihime was sad that because of her hard work she could never meet and fall in love with anyone. Concerned about his daughter, Tentei arranged for her to meet (also referred to as ) who lived and worked on the other side of the Amanogawa. When the two met, they fell instantly in love with each other and married shortly thereafter. However, once married, Orihime would no longer weave cloth for Tentei and Hikoboshi allowed his cows to stray all over Heaven. In anger, Tentei separated the two lovers across the Amanogawa and forbade them to meet. Orihime became despondent at the loss of her husband and asked her father to let them meet again. Tentei was moved by his daughter's tears and allowed the two to meet on the 7th day of the 7th month if she worked hard and finished her weaving. The first time they tried to meet, however, they found that they could not cross the river because there was no bridge. Orihime cried so much that a flock of magpies came and promised to make a bridge with their wings so that she could cross the river. It is said that if it rains on Tanabata, the magpies cannot come because of the rise of the river and the two lovers must wait until another year to meet. The rain of this day is called "The tears of Orihime and Hikoboshi".

Names

Characters
Orihime and Hikoboshi are called various names in the different versions of the story.

Festival
The Festival of Tanabata is also known by various names:

Other stories

Human male and Heavenly female
Japanese scholars pointed out that some tales of the Tanabata cross over with the character of the Celestial Maiden (otherwise known in Japan as Tennin Nyoobo or Hagoromo).

Comparative scholarship on the Japanese variants points that at the beginning of the story, the human male goes near a lake for a variety of reasons (a prayer to the gods for a wife; a vision sent in a dream; a grateful animal points him the way). Over the course of the story, the human partner reaches the celestial realm where his wife and her family live. Once there, he is forced to perform tasks before they reunite. At the end of the narrative, the husband breaks a taboo (he should not eat a certain melon/gourd, but he does and is washed away) and he and his celestial wife are separated, only to reunite again during the night of 7 July.

James Danandjaja relates the Japanese tale of Amafuri Otome ("The Woman who came from the Sky"), as a similar tale of the unmarried mortal man, named Mikeran, who withholds the kimono from a bathing lady so she cannot fly home to the sky. Years after they marry, she finds her kimono and flies home with their children. Mikeran fashions a thousand straw sandals to reach the sky world and find his wife. When he meets his parents-in-law, the father-in-law forces him to perform some tasks, and tricks the human with cutting a thousand watermelons in one day. The human's sky wife knows it is a trap, but he does it anyway and is washed away by a flood created from the watermelons. Thus, they can only meet on the night of the Tanabata festival.

Human female and Heavenly male
Professors Masako Satō and Noriko T. Reider provided a narrative analysis of an ancient tale involving a human female and her future consort, Prince Ame-waka-hiko. In this tale of the Otogi-zōshi genre, the Prince takes the form of a serpent and marries a human woman. He later reveals he is a heavenly deity named Dragon Prince. After some time, he disappears and his human bride must seek him out (akin to the Graeco-Roman myth of Cupid and Psyche), even reaching the heavenly realm, where his father, an oni, lives. At the end of this tale, the lovers are forcibly separated by the oni father and can only reunite during the Tanabata.

Noriko T. Reider draws attention to a second story of this combination: the "Qian Luwei Tale". In this version, the human wife's father is identified as Qian Luwei, and the male deity is Hikoboshi, the son of "Bontennō", Brahma.

Customs 

The bamboo and decorations are often set afloat on a river or burned after the festival, around midnight or on the next day. This resembles the custom of floating paper ships and candles on rivers during Obon. Many areas in Japan have their own Tanabata customs, which are mostly related to local Obon traditions. There is also a traditional Tanabata song:

Date 
The original Tanabata date was based on the Japanese lunisolar calendar, which is about a month behind the Gregorian calendar. As a result, some festivals are held on 7 July, some are held on a few days around 7 August (according to the "One-Month Delay" way), while the others are still held on the seventh day of the seventh lunar month of the traditional Japanese lunisolar calendar, which is usually in August in the Gregorian Calendar.

The Gregorian dates of "the seventh day of the seventh lunar month of the Japanese lunisolar calendar" for the coming years are:
 2018: August 17
 2019: August 7
 2020: August 25
 2021: August 14
 2022: August 4
 2023: August 22
 2024: August 10
 2025: August 29
 2026: August 19

Festivals 

Large-scale Tanabata festivals are held in many places in Japan, mainly along shopping malls and streets, which are decorated with large, colorful streamers. The most famous Tanabata festival is held in Sendai from 6 to 8 August. In the Kantō area, two of the largest Tanabata festivals are held in Hiratsuka, Kanagawa (around 7 July) and in Asagaya, Tokyo immediately prior to the start of the Obon holiday in mid August. A Tanabata festival is also held in São Paulo, Brazil around the first weekend of July and Los Angeles, California in the beginning of August.

Although Tanabata festivals vary by region, most festivals involve Tanabata decoration competitions. Other events may include parades and Miss Tanabata contests. Like other Japanese matsuri, many outdoor stalls sell food, provide carnival games, etc., and add to the festive atmosphere.

Tokyo Disneyland and Tokyo Disney Sea often celebrates the Tanabata Festival featuring a greeting parade with Minnie as Orihime and Mickey as Hikoboshi.

Sendai festival 
The Sendai Tanabata Festival is the most famous in Japan. Tanabata has been celebrated in the region since the time of Date Masamune (1567–1636) who was the first warlord in the Sendai area. The festival began shortly after the city was founded in the early Edo Period. The Tanabata festival gradually developed and became larger over the years. Although the festival's popularity started to dwindle after the Meiji Restoration, and almost disappeared during the economic depression that occurred after World War I, volunteers in Sendai revived the festival in 1928 and established the tradition of holding the festival from 6 to 8 August.

During World War II it was impossible to hold the festival, and almost no decorations were seen in the city from 1943 to 1945, but after the war, the first major Tanabata festival in Sendai was held in 1946, and featured 52 decorations. In 1947, the Showa Emperor Hirohito visited Sendai and was greeted by 5,000 Tanabata decorations. The festival subsequently developed into one of the three major summer festivals in the Tōhoku region and became a major tourist attraction.  The festival now includes a fireworks show that is held on 5 August.

At the Sendai Tanabata Festival, people traditionally use seven different kinds of decorations, which each represent different meanings. The seven decorations and their symbolic meanings are:

The ornamental ball (薬玉; Kusudama) often decorated above streamers in present-day Tanabata decorations was originally conceived in 1946 by the owner of a shop in downtown Sendai. The ball was originally modeled after the dahlia flower. In recent years, box-shaped ornaments have become popular alternatives to the ornamental ball.

G8 summit in 2008

In 2008, the 34th G8 summit in Tōyako, Hokkaidō coincided with Tanabata.  As host, Japanese Prime Minister Yasuo Fukuda invited the G8 leaders to participate in the spirit of the festival. They were each asked to write a wish on a piece of paper called tanzaku, to hang the tanzaku on a bamboo tree, and then to take the necessary actions to change the world for the better.  As a symbolic gesture, the actual writing and the act of hanging up that note is at least a first step.

The Japanese Ministry of Foreign Affairs made colored strips of paper and a bamboo tree for G8 wishes available in Roppongi during the summit. Protesting organizations in Sapporo during the G8 summit also tried to use the spirit of Tanabata to focus attention on a somewhat different set of wishes. Non-governmental organizations including Oxfam and CARE International set up an online wish petition campaign to coincide with the G8 Summit and Tanabata. Outside Japan, Fukuda's timely gesture had unanticipated consequences. For example, the Indian nationally circulated newspaper, The Hindu, picked up on this festival theme by printing an editorial featuring unconventional Tanabata wishes.

Fukuda also invited his fellow citizens to try turning off the lights in their house and stepping outside to enjoy with their family the sight of the Milky Way in the night sky. On 7 July, the Japanese Ministry of the Environment anticipated that over 70,000 facilities and households across Japan would switch off their lights from 20:00 to 22:00 as a symbolic step and as a wish for the future.

See also 
 Sekidera Komachi, a famous Noh play set during the Tanabata festival
 Mobara Tanabata Festival
 Qixi Festival
 Chilseok
 Japanese festivals

Explanatory footnotes

References

Further reading
 Como, Michael. Weaving and Binding: Immigrants Gods and Female Immortals in Ancient Japan. University of Hawai'i Press, 2009. Accessed June 30, 2021. .

External links

 Kids Web Japan
 Tanabata Festival in SendaiNHK

August observances
Festivals in Japan
July observances
Observances set by the traditional Japanese calendar
Shinto